Coroebus of Elis (Kóroibos Ēleîos) was a Greek cook, baker, and athlete from Elis. He is remembered as the winner (olympioníkes) of the first recorded Olympics, which consisted of a single footrace known as the stade or stadion. He is frequently described as having won the first Olympic Games, but Eusebius and other ancient writers stated that he was simply the first recorded winner, variously placing the first games in the Heroic Age, 27 olympiads before Coroebus, or 13 olympiads before. Coroebus being the earliest winner known to Hippias, his is still reckoned the "1st Olympiad"; following Hippias's dating, his victory is generally placed in the summer of the year 776 . The stadium at Olympia was one stade (600 Greek feet, 630.8 English feet, 192.27 m) long and the competition was still clothed in his time, naked competition beginning with Orsippus around 720 . For winning the race, Coroebus received an olive wreath and was later revered by the people of Elis, his grave still being known in the time of Pausanias.

See also
 Stadion race, unit, and stadium
 List of ancient Olympic victors

References 

8th-century BC Greek people
Ancient Olympic competitors
Ancient Eleans
Ancient Greek runners